Peristenus is a genus of hymenopteran parasitoid belonging to the family Braconidae.

Species
 Peristenus accinctus (Haliday, 1835) 
 Peristenus adelphocorides Loan, 1979 
 Peristenus angifemoralis van Achterberg & Guerrero, 2003 
 Peristenus brevicornis (Herrich-Schäffer, 1838) 
 Peristenus dayi Goulet, 2006
 Peristenus digoneutis Loan, 1973 
 Peristenus facialis (Thomson, 1892) 
 Peristenus gloriae van Achterberg & Guerrero, 2003 
 Peristenus grandiceps (Thomson, 1892) 
 Peristenus howardi Shaw, 1999
 Peristenus kazak (Tobias, 1986) 
 Peristenus kokujevi (Tobias, 1986) 
 Peristenus maderae (Graham, 1986) 
 Peristenus malatus Loan, 1976 
 Peristenus mellipes (Cresson, 1872) 
 Peristenus microcerus (Thomson, 1892) 
 Peristenus nitidus (Curtis, 1833) 
 Peristenus obscuripes (Thomson, 1892) 
 Peristenus orchesiae (Curtis, 1833) 
 Peristenus pallipes (Curtis, 1833) 
 Peristenus picipes (Curtis, 1833) 
 Peristenus pseudopallipes (Loan, 1970)
 Peristenus relictus (Ruthe, 1856) 
 Peristenus rubricollis (Thomson, 1892) 
 Peristenus trjapitzini (Tobias, 1986) 
 Peristenus varisae van Achterberg, 2001

References

Braconidae genera
Euphorinae